Mithridates or Mithradates V Euergetes (which means "Mithridates the benefactor"; fl. 2nd century BC, r. 150–120 BC) was a prince and the seventh king of the wealthy Kingdom of Pontus.

Mithridates V was of Greek Macedonian and Persian ancestry. He was the son of the King Pharnaces I of Pontus and Queen Nysa, while his sister was Nysa of Cappadocia. His mother is believed to have died during childbirth, while giving birth to either him or his sister. He was born and raised in the Kingdom of Pontus. Mithridates V succeeded his paternal aunt Laodice and paternal uncle Mithridates IV of Pontus on the Pontian throne, but the circumstance of his accession is uncertain.

Mithridates V continued the alliance with the Roman Republic started by his predecessors. He supported them with some ships and a small auxiliary force during the Third Punic War (149–146 BC) and at a subsequent period rendered them useful assistance in the war against the King of Pergamon, Eumenes III (131–129 BC).

For his services on this occasion, Mithridates V was rewarded by the Roman consul Manius Aquillius with the province of Phrygia. However the acts of the Roman consul were rescinded by the Roman Senate on the grounds of bribery, but it appears that he maintained his possession of Phrygia until his death. Mithridates V also increased the power of the Kingdom of Pontus by the marriage of his eldest child, his daughter Laodice of Cappadocia to King Ariarathes VI of Cappadocia. The end of his reign can only be approximately determined based on statements concerning the accession of his son Mithridates VI, which is assigned to the year 120 BC, signaling the end of the reign of Mithridates V.

Mithridates V was assassinated in about 120 BC in Sinope, poisoned by unknown persons at a lavish banquet which he held.
Mithridates V was a great benefactor to the Hellenic culture which shows on surviving coinage and honorific inscriptions stating his donations in Athens and Delos and held the Greek God Apollo in great veneration. A bilingual inscription dedicated to him is displayed at the Capitoline Museums in Rome. Mithridates V was buried in the royal tombs of his ancestors at Amasya.

Mithridates V married the Greek Seleucid Princess Laodice VI, who was the daughter of Antiochus IV Epiphanes and Laodice IV. Mithridates V and Laodice VI were related, thus he was connected to the Seleucid dynasty.

Laodice bore Mithridates V eight children: Laodice of Cappadocia, Mithridates VI of Pontus, Mithridates Chrestus, Laodice, Nysa (sometimes spelt as Nyssa), Roxana and Statira. Roxana and Statira were compelled to kill themselves with poison after the fall of the Kingdom of Pontus in 63 BC. Nysa was taken prisoner by the Romans and made to march in the triumphs of two Roman generals.

References

Sources
 Smith, William (editor); Dictionary of Greek and Roman Biography and Mythology, "Mithridates V", Boston, (1867)
 
 Walbank, W. The Cambridge ancient history: The Hellenistic world, Volume 7 F. Cambridge University Press, 1984
 McGing, B.C. The foreign policy of Mithridates VI Eupator, King of Pontus, BRILL, 1986
 Hazel, J. Who's Who in the Roman World, "Mithridates V Euergetes", 2002
 Erciyas, D.B. Wealth, aristocracy and royal propaganda under the Hellenistic kingdom of the Mithradatids in the Central Black Sea Region in Turkey, BRILL, 2006
 Mayor, A. The Poison King: the life and legend of Mithradates, Rome’s deadliest enemy, Princeton University Press, 2009
 Dakshveer Singh

External links

Callatay, Francois, The First Royal Coinages of Pontos

120 BC deaths
Mithridatic kings of Pontus
Ancient Persian people
2nd-century BC Iranian people
Iranian people of Greek descent
2nd-century BC murdered monarchs
2nd-century BC rulers in Asia
Year of birth unknown